William Hannan may refer to:
 William Hannan (painter) (died c. 1775), Scottish draughtsman and painter

 William W. Hannan (1854–1917), American real estate developer

 William Hannan (1906-1987), Scottish Labour Party politician